Francisco Rodriguez (born December 11, 1972) is an American former professional baseball pitcher who played in Major League Baseball.

Amateur career
Rodriguez won the Dick Howser Trophy in 1991. At the time of the award, Rodriguez was playing for Howard Junior College in Big Spring, Texas.  As the equivalent of the Heisman Trophy for college football, The Dick Howser Trophy is the annual national award for the outstanding collegiate baseball player.  Since 1991, no other junior college baseball player has won the award.  Rodriguez was an outstanding shortstop and pitcher for the Howard College Hawks and he led his team to the 1991 National Junior College World Series Championship held annually in Grand Junction, Colorado.

Professional career
Rodriguez was drafted as a shortstop by the Boston Red Sox in the second round of the 1990 amateur draft. An agreement was reached a few weeks into the 1991 season, after which he was assigned to the Class A-Short Season Elmira Pioneers. When his new teammates greeted him at the Elmira-Corning Regional Airport, the Brooklyn native was wearing clothes that bore the New York Yankees logo. After Rodriguez advanced to Class A Lynchburg Red Sox, the Red Sox realized he had greater value as a pitcher, a position he quickly began playing. He made his major league debut for the Red Sox in 1995.

Soon after, he was traded to the Minnesota Twins for closer Rick Aguilera. He did not pitch well for the Twins, posting a 25–32 record with the team in over three years of service. The Seattle Mariners claimed him off of waivers in May 1999. He played for the Mariners through the end of the 2000 season. He played for the Cincinnati Reds in 2001 and has not pitched in the majors since. He has a career record of 29–39 and an ERA of 5.53.

In 2008, he returned to pro baseball playing for the Newark Bears of the Atlantic League where he pitched a 2–1 record, with a 7.79 ERA.

Coaching career
, Rodriguez is an assistant coach for the baseball team at SUNY Maritime College in the Bronx, New York.

References

External links

Major League Baseball pitchers
Boston Red Sox players
Minnesota Twins players
Seattle Mariners players
Cincinnati Reds players
Tacoma Rainiers players
1972 births
Living people
Baseball players from New York (state)
Newark Bears players
Eastern District High School alumni
Sportspeople from Brooklyn
Baseball players from New York City
American expatriate baseball players in Australia
Maritime Privateers baseball coaches
Brisbane Bandits players
Lynchburg Red Sox players
New Britain Red Sox players
Pawtucket Red Sox players
Salt Lake Buzz players
Louisville RiverBats players
Elmira Pioneers players
Gulf Coast Red Sox players
Howard Hawks baseball players